= Translation (ecclesiastical) =

Transfer of a bishop between episcopal sees

Translation is the transfer of a bishop from one episcopal see to another. The word is from the Latin translatio, meaning "carry across" (another religious meaning of the term is the translation of relics).

This can be:

- From one diocesan bishopric to another bishopric which is perceived as more important (or the bishop prefers as their see)
- From suffragan bishop status to diocesan bishop
- From coadjutor bishop to diocesan bishop
- From one country's episcopate to another
- From diocesan bishop to archbishop
